Reinhard Mitschek is a former managing director of the Nabucco Gas Pipeline International GmbH, a project company for the Nabucco pipeline project.

References

Austrian chief executives
People associated with energy
Living people
Year of birth missing (living people)